Grammodes justa, the plain box-owlet, is a moth of the family Noctuidae first described by Francis Walker in 1858. It is found in the northern half of  Australia and Papua New Guinea.

The wingspan is about 40 mm. The moths prefer the warmer climate of northern Australia and are considered a pest in the Northern Territory.

References

Ophiusina
Moths described in 1858